Manzura Inoyatova (born 12 February 1985) is a Uzbekistani table tennis player. She competed in the women's singles event at the 2004 Summer Olympics.

References

External links
 

1985 births
Living people
Uzbekistani female table tennis players
Olympic table tennis players of Uzbekistan
Table tennis players at the 2004 Summer Olympics
Place of birth missing (living people)
Table tennis players at the 2002 Asian Games
21st-century Uzbekistani women